Raymond Paul Moore (born June 19, 1953) is a United States district judge of the United States District Court for the District of Colorado.

Biography

Moore was born in 1953 in Boston, Massachusetts. He received his Bachelor of Arts, cum laude, in 1975 from Yale College. He received his Juris Doctor in 1978 from Yale Law School. He served as an associate at Davis, Graham & Stubbs from 1978 to 1982. From 1982 to 1986, he served as an Assistant United States Attorney in the District of Colorado. He returned to Davis, Graham & Stubbs in 1986 and became a partner in 1987. He served as an Assistant Federal Public Defender in Colorado from 1993 to 2003. In January 2004, he became the Federal Public Defender for the Districts of Colorado and Wyoming, serving until 2013.

Federal judicial service

On November 14, 2012, President Barack Obama nominated Moore to serve as a United States District Judge for the United States District Court for the District of Colorado, to the seat being vacated by Judge Wiley Young Daniel, who took senior status, effective January 1, 2013. On January 3, 2013, his nomination was returned to the President, due to the sine die adjournment of the Senate. On January 3, 2013, he was renominated to the same office. His nomination was reported by the Senate Judiciary Committee on February 14, 2013, by voice vote. He was confirmed by voice vote on the legislative day of March 22, 2013. He received his commission on March 26, 2013.

See also 
 List of African-American federal judges
 List of African-American jurists

References

External links

Hon. Raymond P. Moore

1953 births
Living people
African-American judges
Assistant United States Attorneys
Judges of the United States District Court for the District of Colorado
Lawyers from Boston
Public defenders
United States district court judges appointed by Barack Obama
21st-century American judges
Yale Law School alumni
Yale College alumni